Sergey Vladimirovich Gauthier (born September 23, 1947 in Moscow, Soviet Union) is a Russian surgeon and transplantologist, Academician of the Russian Academy of Sciences (since 2013), Academician of the Russian Academy of Medical Sciences (since 2011), Chief Transplantologist of the Ministry of Healthcare of the Russian Federation, Doctor of Medical Sciences (Dsc).

Since 2008 Director of the V.I. Shumakov National Medical Research Center of Transplantology and Artificial Organs of the Ministry of Healthcare of the Russian  Federation.

Also since 2008, he heads the Department of Transplantology and Artificial Organs at the I.M. Sechenov First Moscow State Medical University.

He graduated from the I.M. Sechenov First Moscow State Medical University in 1971, and he defended his Candidate's Dissertation in 1976.

Academician S.V. Gauthier is the author more than 700 scientific works.

References

External links 
 Russian Academy of Sciences (in Russian)
 Official Site of the V.I. Shumakov National Medical Research Center of Transplantology and Artificial Organs of the Ministry of Healthcare of the Russian  Federation (in Russian)

Living people
1947 births
Russian surgeons
Full Members of the Russian Academy of Sciences
Academicians of the Russian Academy of Medical Sciences
I.M. Sechenov First Moscow State Medical University alumni